Brickell station is a Metrorail rapid transit station in Miami, Florida, serving the system's Green and Orange Lines. One of the core stations of Miami's public transport network, it serves the financial district of Brickell. Combined, the Metrorail and Metromover station complex at Brickell sees roughly 8,430 boardings each weekday, making it the system's second-busiest station.

Location

The Brickell station is located in the median of SW 1st Avenue at its intersection with SW 11th Street in the central Miami neighborhood of Brickell. Excluding nearby Metromover stations, it is the closest rail stop to attractions such as Brickell Key, Mary Brickell Village, Brickell Avenue and Simpson Park.

Transit-oriented development
Like other rail stations in Miami's central business district, Brickell has been the focal point for significant transit-oriented development (TOD), particularly in the real estate boom of the 2000s and 2010s. New developments such as Axis at Brickell Village, Infinity at Brickell and Plaza on Brickell are all within a short distance of the station, as are numerous other residential and commercial projects. Once considered a failed example of TOD, and referred to as only "transit-adjacent development", over the past few years Brickell (Metromover) ridership has risen from approximately fifth place to as high as second place for some months in 2015 and 2016. Metrorail ridership growth at this station also outpaced most other stations, and by June 2016, it was the second highest ridership station on the Metrorail as well amid heavy losses at some stations, namely Dadeland South and Dadeland North.

History

One of the original Metrorail stations, Brickell opened along with the initial stretch of the system from Dadeland South to Historic Overtown/Lyric Theatre, then called "Overtown." The Metromover station opened ten years later on May 26, 1994.

It featured as a level in the videogame Hotline Miami.

Station layout
The Metrorail station and Metromover station are located next to each other and are connected by an overhang. The Metrorail station can hold up to six cars and has a canopy covering most of the platform.  The Metromover platform can hold up to two Metromover cars and is completely covered.

Gallery

References

External links

MDT – Metrorail Stations
MDT – Metromover Stations
 Metromover Station from Google Maps Street View
 Metrorail entrance from Google Maps Street View

Brickell Loop
Green Line (Metrorail)
Orange Line (Metrorail)
Metromover stations
Metrorail (Miami-Dade County) stations in Miami
Railway stations in the United States opened in 1984
1984 establishments in Florida